

Table comparison between the US and Chinese Military

References

Military comparisons